, , or  is a village in the municipality of Fauske in Nordland county, Norway. The lakes Låmivatnet, Kjelvatnet, and Muorkkejávrre are located to the east and south of the village.

Sultitjelma is virtually surrounded by mountains and glaciers. Sulitjelma is at the southern terminus of the Nordkalottruta hiking trail. Winters in Sulitjelma have reliable snow cover and are on average  colder than in the town of Fauske. The village is the birthplace of academic Geir Lundestad. Sulitjelma Church and Sulitjelma Chapel are both located in the village. There are many old mines in the area.

History
Archaeological finds of human occupation in the area date back more than a thousand years. The village originated as a Sámi settlement, who bred reindeer during summers through the end of the 16th century. Around 1848, the first Norwegians moved into the area to clear farms and to settle.  In 1858,    Mons Andreas Petersen (1829–1886)  sent ore samples to Venset. This led to additional research which resulted in confirmed copper and sulfur deposits  in the area.

Mining
In 1887, the Swedish industrialist and entrepreneur Nils Persson (1836-1916)  bought the mineral rights to those findings and the mining era began.

Sulitjelma Gruber was founded in 1891 as a Norwegian limited company to mine the area's minerals.  In addition to the mines themselves, there was also a plant for processing the ore, a smelting plant, a conveying plant, as well as all the other necessary service institutions needed to support the growing population of the community.  By the early 20th century, it was the largest mining company in the country—and the second largest Norwegian industrial company.  At its peak in 1913, the company had 1,750 employees.

Over time it became necessary to go deeper into the mountain to reach the ore. This increased the cost of the operations. When the mining license expired in 1983, the state took over the operation under the name of Sulitjelma Bergverk A/S. In 1991, all mining in Sulitjelma was stopped as the costs of extraction became greater than the value of the ore on the market. The remaining ore deposits still constitute the largest known deposit of copper in Norway.

The construction of the Sulitjelma Line railway began in May 1891 when the mining company in Sulitjelma decided to build a railway between the villages of Sjønstå and Fossen. The line was the first in Northern Norway. The railroad line was closed on 22 July 1972. The tracks were removed and the former trackbed was converted into a roadway. Norwegian County Road 830 opened to traffic in 1975.

References

External links
 University of Tromsø: Architecture in Sulitjelma In English, with pictures

Fauske
Villages in Nordland
Valleys of Nordland
Populated places of Arctic Norway